The South Carolina Education Association (SCEA) is a public education advocacy organization in the U.S. state of South Carolina, representing both teachers and educational support professionals. It has local affiliates in each of the state's 81 public school districts. It is the state affiliate of the National Education Association.

The SCEA was founded in 1881 as a teachers' advocacy organization.  However, at that time membership was limited only to White educators.  On April 1, 1967, the SCEA merged with the Palmetto Education Association, a parallel association of Black educators founded in 1896.  The merger of these two educational organizations was the largest combination of racially segregated associations in the history of the state of South Carolina.  Membership in the SCEA rose to nearly 25,000 black and white educators immediately after the merger.

The SCEA was an important contributor to the development of the South Carolina Education Improvement Act (EIA) of 1984, where it participated in direct negotiations with Governor Richard Riley.  As a compromise for accepting a merit pay structure, it negotiated a 16% pay increase for educators in the state, bringing their salaries near or above the industry average for the Southeastern United States.  This legislation was considered to be the most comprehensive state-level educational reform in the United States to date.

The SCEA regularly comments on state-level educational issues and performs advocacy work.  Members of the SCEA participated in the #REDforEd teacher activities.  The organization stressed that events in South Carolina were not officially sanctioned and that it was not an organizer but it did offer to support its members that did participate

The Palmetto State Teachers Association split from the SCEA in 1976.

See also

Palmetto State Teachers Association
SC for Ed

References

Trade unions established in 1881
Politics of South Carolina
National Education Association
Trade unions in South Carolina
Organizations based in Columbia, South Carolina
1881 establishments in South Carolina
State wide trade unions in the United States